Mahemdavad is a town with municipality in the Kheda district in the Indian state of Gujarat. Mahemdavad is situated on the Vatrak River bank. The nearest city is Kheda.  It is 30 km from largest city of Gujarat, Ahmedabad.

Nearest airport to reach here is Sardar Vallabhbhai Patel International Airport.

Etymology
Mahemdavad was established by the king Mahmud Begada, the grandson of Ahmed Shah, and it was initially named as Mahmudabad after king Mahmud.

Geography

Demographics
 India census, Mahemdavad has a population of 30,769. Males constitute 52% of the population and females 48%. Mahemdavad has an average literacy rate of 70%, higher than the national average of 59.5%: male literacy is 77%, and female literacy is 63%. In Mahemdavad, 12% of the population is under 6 years of age.

Places of interest

Bhammariyo Kuvo 

This is an ancient well with seven floors (storeys) below the ground. Each floor has a different architecture. Currently floors four to seven of the well are filled so visitors are only able to view the top three floors. It was built during the Gujarat Sultanate.

Education 
Educational institutes of Mahemdabad include: Shanti Niketan English School, Seth J. H. Sonawala High School, St. Xavier's High School, Vedanta High School and the local municipal school. A PTC (Primary Teachers' Certificate) college has come up recently in the town. Most of the schools instruct their students in Gujarati.

Schools 
Shanti Niketan English School runs nursery to 6th in English medium. International methodology applied keeping Indian values as high priority.
Sheth J. H. Sonawala High School runs 5th std. to 12th std. in science, commerce and arts stream in Gujarati medium.
Gyanjyot High School runs 1st std. to 12th std. in commerce and arts stream in Gujarati medium.
St. Xavier's School runs KG TO 12th std with science and commerce streams. Also English medium from KG to 5th std.
Trinity High School runs KG to 10th std. in English and Gujarati medium.
Santram primary school runs 1st std. to 7th std.
Shree Nyalkaran English Medium School runs from 1st std. 
Shree Sarvoday Vidhya Mandir Modaj, Mahemdavad runs 9th std to 12th std.

Colleges 
Government Polytechnic Kheda (Govt of Gujarat) is situated near Raska Wier in Mahemdabad Taluka (tahesil) under Gujarat Technological University.

These colleges all run under Gujarat University:

Manekchock Co-Op. Bank Arts & Mahemdabad Urban People's Co-Op. Bank Commerce College runs graduation in commerce and arts stream
The Mahemdabad Education Society B. Ed. College
Degree College of Physical Education
Gayatri Kelavani Mandal Sanchalit B. P. E. and Yoga College
D. A. Diploma Engineering and Technology
D. A. Degree Engineering and Technology

Economy
The market place is situated at the heart of the town. The market area is marked by the Virol Darwaja (gate). The market remains open on all days except for Saturday. A variety of small scale cottage industries are found in Mahemdabad. The most popular is the leather bag cottage industry. People from surrounding cities come specially to Mahemdabad to buy purses, hand bags and school bags. In addition, the cobbler is also very famous for his ever-lasting shoes. Apart from these, there are a number of cloth merchants, pharmacies, one or two gold merchants, a few utensils merchants et cetera. On the whole trade and commerce are developed to a good extent here.

Surrounding the market area, a number of residential societies have developed. The oldest of these are: Navjeevan-1,2 and Bapukaka society. These are situated right beside the railway station. There is a Shiv temple in Navjeevan-1. During the festival of Navaratri, people celebrate and play Garba in the yard of this Shiv temple. New society areas like Ashutosh, Sarvoday Society, Mrudul Park, Shroff Nagar, Jyoti Park etc. have developed on the road opposite to the Virol Darwaja. Radhe Kishan Park Residency is on Mahemdawad Khatraj Crossing Road.

Entertainment is very limited in this town. There are two run-down theatres which screen some local Gujarati movies. One or two cyber-cafes have come up recently.

As well as a municipal hospital, there are private hospitals, the main one being Lucky Hospital just outside of the main market. It was established in 1985 by Dr. Vijay Ajmera father of Dr. Akash Ajmera, provides very good care for its patients. Dr. Ajmera is very well known and the only MD gynecologist in the taluka of Mahemdavad which includes some 80 surrounding villages.

During the summer season, a number of gola walas (vendors) fill the road between Viral Darwaja and railway station. People are seen loitering till late nights on these roads and eating golas (gola is made by pressing small ice cubes on a wooden stick and then a flavored liquid like rose, kala khatta etc. is poured on it). In addition, one or two dabeli walas, pav bhaji walas and sugar-cane vendors make good business during the cool summer nights.

Near the railway station, there is a samadhi of Eknathji – a local saint.

There are many old buildings visible in the inner older part of the town. The town holds historical importance since its foundation in 16th Century by ruler of Gujarat sultanate, Mahmud Begada.

Geography
In the 1990s Mahemdabad was famous for its "Dhebri", a delicious crunchy item at Mahemdabad station.

Transport

Railways
Mahemdavad has Mahemadavad Kheda Road as a train station for halting express and superfast trains.

Bus transport
National Highway 59 passes through Mahemdabad.
Mahemdavad links to Ahmedabad, Surat and Ratlam.
Mahemdavad has a bus station for local buses which link to Nadiad, Anand, Ahmedabad, Dakor, and Kheda.
Khatraj Chokdi (The five junction road) near Mahemdavad is connected to major cities by
Ahmedabad road
Modaj, Ghodasar, Haldarvas Road
Mankava, Kathalal road
Mahudha, Dakor, Godhra road
Nadiad, Anand, Vadodara road
Kheda, Limbasi, Khmbhat road
All the express buses stop at Khatraj Chokdi.

Airport 
The nearest international airport is Sardar Vallabhbhai Patel International Airport at Ahmedabad.  The airport code is AMD.
It is only 33 km from Mahemdavad connected by road.
There are direct domestic flights to Mumbai, Delhi, Bangalore, and Kolkata.
Also there are direct international flights to Hong Kong, Singapore, Dubai, Kuwait, London, Chicago and Frankfurt.

References

External links
 About Mahemdabad

Cities and towns in Kheda district